Blind River is a waterway in southeastern Louisiana originating in the Maurepas Swamp Wildlife Management Area of St James Parish west of New Orleans and running northeasterly before turning east to flow into Lake Maurepas.

The lower reaches of Blind River form the boundary between Livingston Parish on the north shore and St James and St. John the Baptist Parish on the south shore.

Rivers of Louisiana
Tributaries of Lake Maurepas
Bodies of water of St. James Parish, Louisiana
Bodies of water of Livingston Parish, Louisiana
Bodies of water of St. John the Baptist Parish, Louisiana